This is a list of events in Scottish television from 1973.

Events
March – Experimental Ceefax teletext transmissions begin.
Unknown - BBC television airs a film version of Douglas Hurd's novel Scotch on the Rocks

Debuts

BBC
Unknown - Scotch on the Rocks
Unknown - Sutherland's Law (1973–1976)

Television series
Scotsport (1957–2008)
Reporting Scotland (1968–1983; 1984–present)
Top Club (1971–1998)
Scotland Today (1972–2009)

Births
9 August - Kevin McKidd, actor
Unknown - Sarah Mack, journalist and presenter

See also
1973 in Scotland

 
Television in Scotland by year
1970s in Scottish television